Juan Archuleta (born September 13, 1987)  is an American mixed martial artist who competes in the Bantamweight division of Bellator MMA, and he is the former Bellator Bantamweight Champion.  A professional MMA competitor since 2013, he has also previously fought for King of the Cage and the World Series of Fighting.

As of July 26, 2022, he is ranked #3 in the Bellator Bantamweight Rankings.

Background
Archuleta was born in Hesperia, California to parents of Spanish and Mexican descent. Archuleta's background is in amateur wrestling. In high school he was a state championship qualifier at Sultana High School. Eventually he moved on to Sacramento City College where he became a junior college All-American, and finally he transferred to Purdue University where he wrestled at the NCAA Division I level. In January 2021, he was promoted to purple belt in Brazilian Jiu Jitsu by his teacher Philipe Furão.

Mixed martial arts career

King of the Cage
After going 12–1 on the regional circuit, Archuleta then began fighting for the King of the Cage promotion. In his first fight with the promotion, Archuleta claimed the KOTC featherweight title when he finished former UFC fighter Chris Tickle in the second round via technical knockout. Archuleta also went on to become KOTC bantamweight, lightweight, and light welterweight champion.

Bellator MMA
After a successful run in King of the Cage, Archuleta signed with Bellator MMA. He made his promotional debut at Bellator 195 against William Joplin. He won the bout via unanimous decision.

His next bout came against Robbie Peralta at Bellator 201 on June 29, 2018. He won the bout via knockout in the third round.

Archuleta next faced Jeremy Spoon at Bellator 210 on November 30, 2018. He won via unanimous decision.

Archuleta's next bout took place on January 26, 2019 against Ricky Bandejas at Bellator 214. He won via unanimous decision.

In his next bout, Archuleta faced former Bellator Bantamweight World Champion Eduardo Dantas at Bellator 222 on June 14, 2019. Archuleta was victorious via knockout at 4:59 of round 2.

For his next fight, Archuleta entered the Bellator Featherweight World Grand Prix and in the opening round, he received a Featherweight title shot against champion Patrício Freire at Bellator 228 on September 28, 2019. He lost via unanimous decision.

Archuleta then faced Henry Corrales at Bellator 238 on January 25, 2020. He was victorious via unanimous decision.

Bellator MMA Bantamweight World Champion
Archuleta returned to the bantamweight division to face Patchy Mix for the vacant Bellator Bantamweight World Championship on September 12, 2020 at Bellator 246. He won the bout via unanimous decision to become Bellator Bantamweight world champion.

Archuleta made his first title defense against Sergio Pettis at Bellator 258 on May 7, 2021. He lost the bout and the title via unanimous decision.

Bellator Bantamweight World Grand Prix 
Archuleta, replacing the injured Sergio Pettis, faced Raufeon Stots for the Interim Bellator Bantamweight World Championship on April 23, 2022 at Bellator 279. Archuleta lost the bout after getting knocked out by a head kick and then finished on the ground with elbows at the beginning of the third round.

Post Grand Prix 
Archuleta faced Enrique Barzola on October 1, 2022 at Bellator 286. At weigh ins, the bout was moved to a catchweight of 141 pounds. In a fast paced bout, Archuleta won the bout via unanimous decision.

Archuleta faced former Road FC and ONE Championship Bantamweight Champion Soo Chul Kim at Bellator MMA vs. Rizin on December 31, 2022. In a close back and forth bout, Archuleta came out of it with a split decision victory.

Archuleta is scheduled to face Naoki Inoue at Rizin 42 on May 6, 2023.

Personal life
After being deemed academically ineligible to continue wrestling at Purdue University, Archuleta succumbed to alcohol addiction and crime. He eventually served a prison stint prior to becoming a mixed martial artist.

Championships and awards
Bellator MMA
Bellator Bantamweight World Championship (One time)
King of the Cage
KOTC Lightweight Championship (One time)
KOTC Featherweight Championship (One time)
Three successful title defenses 
KOTC Bantamweight Championship (One time)
KOTC Light Welterweight Championship (One time)
California Fight League
CFL Featherweight Championship (One time)
Tru-Form Entertainment
TFE Featherweight Championship (One time)
Gladiator Challenge
GC Bantamweight Championship (One time)

Mixed martial arts record

|-
|Win
|align=center| 27–4
|Soo Chul Kim
|Decision (split)
|Bellator MMA vs. Rizin
|
|align=center| 3
|align=center| 5:00
|Saitama, Japan
|
|-
|Win
|align=center|26–4
|Enrique Barzola
|Decision (unanimous)
|Bellator 286
|
|align=center|3
|align=center|5:00
|Long Beach, California, United States
|
|-
|Loss
|align=center| 25–4
| Raufeon Stots
| KO (head kick and elbows)
| Bellator 279
| 
| align=center|3
| align=center|0:16
| Honolulu, Hawaii, United States
|
|-
|Loss
|align=center| 25–3
|Sergio Pettis
|Decision (unanimous)
|Bellator 258
|
|align=center|5
|align=center|5:00
|Uncasville, Connecticut, United States
|
|-
|Win
|align=center| 25–2
|Patchy Mix
|Decision (unanimous)
|Bellator 246
|
|align=center|5
|align=center|5:00
|Uncasville, Connecticut, United States
|
|-
|Win
|align=center| 24–2
|Henry Corrales
|Decision (unanimous)
|Bellator 238
|
|align=center|3
|align=center|5:00
|Inglewood, California, United States
|
|-
|Loss
|align=center| 23–2
|Patrício Freire
|Decision (unanimous)
|Bellator 228 
|
|align=center|5
|align=center|5:00
|Inglewood, California, United States 
|
|-
|Win
|align=center| 23–1
|Eduardo Dantas		
|KO (punch)	
|Bellator 222
|
|align=center|2
|align=center|4:59
|New York City, New York, United States
|
|-
|Win
|align=center| 22–1
|Ricky Bandejas
|Decision (unanimous)
|Bellator 214
|
|align=center|3
|align=center|5:00
|Inglewood, California, United States
|
|-
|Win
|align=center| 21–1
|Jeremy Spoon
|Decision (unanimous)
|Bellator 210
|
|align=center|3
|align=center|5:00
|Thackerville, Oklahoma, United States
|
|-
|Win
|align=center| 20–1
|Robbie Peralta
|KO (punches)
| Bellator 201
|
|align=center|3
|align=center|0:14
|Temecula, California, United States
|
|-
|Win
|align=center| 19–1
|William Joplin
|Decision (unanimous)
| Bellator 195
|
|align=center|3
|align=center|5:00
|Thackerville, Oklahoma, United States
|
|-
|Win
|align=center| 18–1
|Mark Dickman
|TKO (retirement)
| KOTC: Conquistadores
|
|align=center|4
|align=center|5:00
|Ontario, California, United States
|
|-
|Win
|align=center| 17–1
|Adel Altamimi
|TKO (punches)
| KOTC: Never Quit
|
|align=center|1
|align=center|4:23
|Ontario, California, United States
|
|-
| Win
| align=center| 16–1
| Vytautas Sadauskas
| Decision (unanimous)
| KOTC: Baltic Tour
| 
| align=center|5
| align=center|5:00
| Kaunas, Lithuania
| 
|-
| Win
| align=center| 15–1
| Brandon Hastings 
| TKO (punches)
| KOTC: Supernova
| 
| align=center| 1
| align=center| 0:24
| Ontario, California, United States
| 
|-
| Win
| align=center| 14–1
| Derrick Mandell 
| Decision (unanimous)
| KOTC: Warranted Aggression 
| 
| align=center| 5
| align=center| 5:00
| Ontario, California, United States
| 
|-
| Win
| align=center| 13–1
| Jay Bogan 
| TKO (retirement)
| California Fight League 9 
| 
| align=center| 1
| align=center| 5:00
| California, United States
| 
|-
| Win
| align=center| 12–1
| Jordan Griffin
| Decision (unanimous)
| KOTC: Destructive Intent
| 
| align=center| 5
| align=center| 5:00
| Washington, Pennsylvania, United States
| 
|-
| Win
| align=center| 11–1
| Chris Tickle 
| TKO (punches)
| KOTC: Firefight
| 
| align=center| 2
| align=center| 0:41
| San Jacinto, California, United States
| 
|-
| Win
| align=center| 10–1
| Emilio Chavez
| Decision (unanimous)
| SMASH Global 3
| 
| align=center| 3
| align=center| 5:00
| Los Angeles, California, United States
| 
|-
| Win
| align=center| 9–1
| Luis Guerra
| TKO (punches) 
| Tru-Form Entertainment: No Fear
| 
| align=center| 3
| align=center| 2:39
| Sullivan, Indiana, United States
| 
|-
| Win
| align=center| 8–1
| Andrew Natividiad 
| Decision (unanimous)
| California Fight League 5 
| 
| align=center| 3
| align=center| 5:00
| Fort Irwin, California, United States
| 
|-
| Win
| align=center| 7–1
| Alfred Khashakyan 
| Decision (unanimous)
| Lights Out / Bash Entertainment Fight Night At Sportsmen's Lodge 4
| 
| align=center| 3
| align=center| 5:00
| Los Angeles, California, United States
| 
|-
| Win
| align=center| 6–1
| Alex Valdez 
| Submission (Brabo choke)
| Gladiator Challenge: Collision Course 
| 
| align=center| 3
| align=center| 0:13
| Lincoln, California, United States
| 
|-
| Loss
| align=center| 5–1
| Andres Ponce
| Submission (triangle choke)
| WSOF 19
| 
| align=center| 2
| align=center| 0:53
| Phoenix, Arizona, United States
| 
|-
| Win
| align=center| 5–0
| Ralph Acosta
| Decision (split)
| Gladiator Challenge: Season's Beatings 
| 
| align=center| 3
| align=center| 3:00
| Rancho Mirage, California, United States
| 
|-
| Win
| align=center| 4–0
| Valentino Beatty 
| TKO (punches)
| Gladiator Challenge: Carnage
| 
| align=center| 1
| align=center| 2:30
| Lincoln, California, United States
| 
|-
| Win
| align=center| 3–0
| Casey Doyle 
| TKO (punches)
| Gladiator Challenge: Payback 
| 
| align=center| 1
| align=center| 0:46
| San Jacinto, California, United States
| 
|-
| Win
| align=center| 2–0
| Justin Santistevan
| TKO (punches)
| Gladiator Challenge: Night of Champions
| 
| align=center| 3
| align=center| 1:25
| Rancho Mirage, California, United States
| 
|-
| Win
| align=center| 1–0
| David Duran 
| Decision (unanimous)
| BAMMA USA: Badbeat 10
| 
| align=center| 3
| align=center| 5:00
| Commerce, California, United States
|

See also
 List of current Bellator fighters
 List of male mixed martial artists

References

External links
 
 

1987 births
Living people
American practitioners of Brazilian jiu-jitsu
American male mixed martial artists
American mixed martial artists of Mexican descent
American people of Spanish descent
Bellator MMA champions
Bantamweight mixed martial artists
Featherweight mixed martial artists
Lightweight mixed martial artists
Mixed martial artists utilizing boxing
Mixed martial artists utilizing collegiate wrestling
Mixed martial artists utilizing Brazilian jiu-jitsu
People from Tulare County, California
Mixed martial artists from California
Bellator male fighters
American male sport wrestlers
Amateur wrestlers